Jaleswar is a town in the Balasore district of state Odisha, India

Jaleswar may also refer to 

 Jaleswar, Assam, a town in the north east state of Assam, India
 Jaleswar, Assam (Vidhan Sabha constituency)
 Jaleswar, Odisha (Vidhan Sabha constituency)

See also
 Jaleshwar, a municipality in Janakpur Zone, Nepal